Helcystogramma stellatella is a moth in the family Gelechiidae. It was described by August Busck in 1914. It is found in Panama.

The wingspan is about 9 mm. The forewings are dark brown suffused with metallic blue and with scattered single silvery and light blue scales, a few of these congregate to form an ill-defined costal spot at the apical third. The hindwings are dark brownish fuscous.

References

Moths described in 1914
stellatella
Moths of Central America